Zeynep Değirmencioğlu (born 12 September 1954) is a Turkish actress.

Biography
She was born in Istanbul in 1954. She made her first appearance as a one-year-old baby in "Papatya" and established herself as a childstar with appearances in films like "Duvaklı Göl" and "Fırtına". In 1960 she acted in "Ayşecik". The persona of Ayşecik, a sweet, naive girl became her signature role. In the following years she would act in many films where she would play the Ayşecik  persona in different settings. Although she appeared in more mature films, she is known as the most famous child actor in Turkish cinema.  She retired from acting in 1974 with Macera Yolu (Adventure Road) as adult themed fare began to dominate the Turkish film industry and general audience fare moved to television.

After retiring from acting, she became a businesswoman. She is widow of Serkan Acar and has two children.

Filmography
Papatya (1956)
Ölümden De Acı (1958)
Funda (1958)
Duvaklı Göl (1958)
Ömrüm Böyle Geçti (1959)
Ayşecik Şeytan Çekici (1960)
Ayşecik (1960)
Altın Kalpler (1961)
Ayşecik Yavru Melek (1962)
Ayşecik Ateş Parçası (1962)
Ayşecik Fakir Prenses (1963)
Ayşecik Canımın İçi (1963)
Öksüz Kız (1964)
Ayşecik Cimcime Hanım (1964)
Ayşecik Çıtı Pıtı Kız (1964)
Ayşecik Boş Beşik (1965)
İki Yavrucak (1965)
Sokak Kızı (1966)
Çalıkuşu (1966)
Zehirli Çiçek (1967)
Merhamet (1967)
Ayşecik Canım Annem (1967)
Yüzbaşının Kızı (1968)
Yuvana Dön Baba (1968)
Ayşecik Yuvanın Bekçileri (1969)
Sevgili Babam (1969)
Ayşecik'le Ömercik (1969)
Fakir Kızın Romanı (1969)
Yavrum (1970)
Ayşecik Sana Tapıyorum (1970)
Pamuk Prenses Ve 7 Cüceler (1970)
Ayşecik Ve Sihirli Cüceler Rüyalar Ülkesinde (1971)
Hayat Sevince Güzel (1971)
Ayşecik Bahar Çiçeği (1971)
Sinderella Kül Kedisi (1971)
Hayat Mı Bu (1972)
Gelinlik Kızlar (1972)
İlk Aşk (1972)
Anneler Günü (1973)
Öksüzler (1973)
Özleyiş (1973)
Kara Sevda (1973)
Yayla Kızı (1974)
Macera Yolu (1974)

External links
 
 Official site

1954 births
Actresses from Istanbul
Living people
Turkish film actresses
Turkish child actresses
20th-century Turkish actresses